The Melbourne International Comedy Festival Gala, or Oxfam Gala, is a comedy show run annually as part of the Melbourne International Comedy Festival. Billed as Australian comedy's 'night of nights', it is held one week before the festival opens, and acts as a fundraiser for the charity Oxfam Australia.

List of performers by year

1991
Host:
 David Strassman
 Gerry Connolly
 Gina Riley & Tina Arena
 Glenn Robbins & Mary-Anne Fahey
 Jane Turner & Peter Moon
 Kym Gyngell
 Magda Szubanski & Alan Pentland
 Marg Downey
 Matt Parkinson & Greg Fleet
 Nick Giannopoulos & Michael Veitch
 Norman Gunston
 Rachel Berger
 Sean Hughes
 Shane Bourne
 Steve Blackburn & Geoff Brooks
 Terry Jones
 The D-Generation (Rob Sitch, Santo Cilauro & Tom Gleisner)
 Wendy Harmer

1992
Host: Shane Bourne
 Agro
 Bea Arthur
 Chris Lynam
 David Strassman
 George Kapiniaris
 Georgie Parker
 Gerry Connolly (as Elizabeth II)
 Jane Turner (as Bobbie Battista)
 Jimeoin
 Kate Raison
 Libbi Gorr (as Elle McFeast) with Janine De Lorenzo
 Nick Giannopoulos
 Rachel Berger
 Scared Weird Little Guys
 Simon Hill (as Paul Keating)
 Stomp
 The Blakeney Twins
 The Found Objects (Colin Lane, Frank Woodley & Scott Casley)
 Tiny Tim
 Effie (Mary Coustas)
 Trevor Marmalade

1993
Host: Gerry Connolly and Ernie Dingo
 Andy Goodone
 Anthony Morgan
 Chris Lynam
 Darren Casey
 Greg Champion
 Jimeoin
 Judith Lucy
 Lano & Woodley
 Lenny Henry
 Marty Putz
 Mary Coustas (as Effie)
 Rachel Berger
 Sal Upton
 Sean Hughes
 Shane Bourne
 Simon Hill (as Jeff Kennett)
 Stomp
 The Amazing Johnathan
 The Empty Pockets (Greg Fleet & Matt Quartermaine)
 The Scared Weird Little Guys

1994
Host: Wendy Harmer
 Bobcat Goldthwait
 Ennio Marchetto
 Flacco (Paul Livingston)
 Franklyn Ajaye
 Glynn Nicholas
 Jack Dee
 Jimeoin
 Judith Lucy
 Kinky Friedman
 Lano & Woodley
 Leslie Nielsen
 New Joke City (Greg Fleet, Marty Sheargold & Matt King)
 No Dangly Bits (Robyn Butler & Jeanette Cronin)
 Olé
 Phil Kay
 Steady Eddy
 The Amazing Johnathan
 Tokyo Shock Boys
 Tom Kenny

1995
Host: Andrew Denton featuring Magda Szubanski
 Alan Davies
 Anthony Morgan
 Brian Nankervis
 Emo Philips
 Flacco
 Glynn Nicholas
 Jack Dee
 Judith Lucy
 Lano & Woodley
 Lee Evans
 Lynda Gibson
 Rachel Berger
 Robyn Butler
 Scott Capurro
 Sean Hughes
 Steady Eddy
 Steve Kearney
 The 3 Canadians
 Scared Weird Little Guys
 Vince Sorrenti

1996
Host: Julia Morris featuring Bruno Lucia
 Bill Bailey
 Bob Downe
 Bob Franklin & Matt King
 Ed Byrne
 Flacco
 Fred Rowan
 Greg Fleet
 Jimeoin
 Lano & Woodley
 Paul McDermott & Mosh
 Poulter & Duff
 Rich Hall
 Rudy Coby
 Scared Weird Little Guys
 Scott Capurro
 Wadaiko Ichiro

1997
Host: Judith Lucy and Shane Bourne
 Bill Bailey
 Boothby Graffoe
 Corky and the Juice Pigs
 Dame Sybil (Seán Cullen)
 Ed Byrne
 Frank Skinner
 Greg Fleet
 Greg Proops
 Hung Le
 Jeff Green
 Lano & Woodley
 Peter Berner
 Rhona Cameron
 Rich Hall
 Rod Quantock
 Scared Weird Little Guys
 Umbilical Brothers

1998
Host: Paul McDermott
 Al Murray The Pub Landlord
 Alan Parker (Simon Munnery)
 Anthony Morgan
 Dave O'Neil
 Bob Downe (Mark Trevorrow)
 Ed Byrne
 Greg Fleet
 James O'Loghlin
 John Hegley
 Julian Clary
 Matt King
 Owen O'Neill
 Parsons and Naylor
 STOMP
 The Fabulous Singlettes
 The Nualas
 Scared Weird Little Guys
 The Three Canadians
 Tokyo Shock Boys
 Urban Warrior
 Wil Anderson
Source:

1999
Host: Rove McManus
 Jeff Green
 Carl Barron
 Judith Lucy
 Drew Fraser
 Lano & Woodley
 Adam Bloom
 Matt King
 Patrice O'Neal
 Scared Weird Little Guys
 Greg Fleet
 The League Against Tedium (Simon Munnery)
 Rachel Berger
 Dave Hughes
 Jimeoin
 Franklyn Ajaye
 Wil Anderson
 Dave O'Neil
 James O'Loghlin
 David Strassman
 Keith Robinson
 Lynn Ferguson
 Tripod
Source:

2000
Host: Lano & Woodley
 Adam Bloom
 Arctic Boosh
 Arj Barker
 Boothby Graffoe & Phil Moriarty
 Carl Barron
 Cool Heat Urban Beat
 Dave Hughes
 Dave O'Neil
 Denise Scott
 Greg Fleet
 Johnny Vegas
 Kitty Flanagan
 Lano & Woodley
 Margaret Smith
 Matt King
 Peter Berner
 Peter Helliar
 Rachel Berger
 Sarah Kendall
 Scared Weird Little Guys
 Stewart Lee
 Tom Rhodes
 Tripod
 Wil Anderson
Source:

2001
Host: Jimeoin
 Adam Hills
 Arj Barker
 Auto Boosh
 Chris Addison
 Dave Gorman
 Dave Hughes
 Dave O'Neil
 Deirdre O'Kane
 Greg Fleet
 Jeff Green
 Jenny Eclair
 Jimeoin
 Johnny Vegas
 Judith Lucy
 Lano & Woodley
 Miss Itchy
 Peter Helliar
 Rich Hall aka Otis Lee Crenshaw
 Rod Quantock
 Sarah Kendall
 Tripod
 Wil Anderson
Source:

2002
Host: Wil Anderson
 Al Murray
 Bob Downe
 Carl Barron
 Chris Addison
 Daniel Kitson
 Dave Hughes
 Hattie Hayridge
 John Hegley
 Lano & Woodley
 Paul McDermott
 Peter Helliar
 Rachel Berger
 René Hicks
 Tony Woods
 Tripod
 Umbilical Brothers
Source:

2003
Host: Dave Hughes
 Arj Barker
 Boothby Graffoe
 Cal Wilson
 Dan Antopolski
 Damian Callinan
 Daniel Kitson
 Danny Bhoy
 Dave Callan
 Dave Hughes
 Dave O'Neil
 Fiona O'Loughlin
 Flight of the Conchords
 Francesca Martinez
 Glenn Wool
 Jimeoin
 Lawrence Mooney
 Lee Mack
 Men in Coats
 Mike Wilmot
 Noel Fielding
 Paul McDermott and GUD
 Sarah Kendall
 Tom Gleeson
 Tripod
 Wil Anderson
Source:

2004
Host: Magda Szubanski
 Adam Hills
 Akmal Saleh
 Chris Addison
 Daniel Kitson
 Danny Bhoy
 Dave Hughes
 Denise Scott
 Fiona O'Loughlin
 Greg fleet
 Howard Read (as Big Howard Little Howard)
 Lano & Woodley
 Lee Mack
 Maria Bamford
 Meshel Laurie
 Paul McDermott and GUD
 Rob Rouse
 Sarah Kendall
 Scared Weird Little Guys
 The Schneedles
 Todd Barry
 Tom Gleeson
 Tripod
 Wil Anderson
Source:

2005
Host: Dave Hughes
 Adam Hills
 Akmal Saleh
 Arj Barker
 Bill Bailey
 Bob Downe
 Chris Addison
 Danny Bhoy
 Dave O'Neil
 Demetri Martin
 Denise Scott
 Eddie Perfect
 Paul McDermott and GUD
 Jason Byrne
 Jeff Green
 Jimeoin
 Maria Bamford
 Mike Wilmot
 Rich Hall
 Scott Brennan & Cal Wilson
 Sean Lock
 Stephen K Amos
 The Kransky Sisters
 Tripod
 Umbilical Brothers
 Wil Anderson
Source:

2006
Host: Adam Hills
 Arj Barker
 Cal Wilson
 Charlie Pickering
 Corinne Grant
 Danny Bhoy
 Dave Hughes
 David O'Doherty
 Demetri Martin
 Dylan Moran
 Fiona O'Loughlin
 Freestyle Love Supreme
 Jason Byrne
 Jimeoin & Bob Franklin
 Judith Lucy
 Lano and Woodley
 Rich Hall and Mike Wilmot
 Stephen K Amos
 Tim Minchin
 Tripod
 Wil Anderson
Source:

2007
Host: Peter Helliar
 Adam Hills
 Ardal O'Hanlon
 Corinne Grant
 Dave Hughes
 David O'Doherty
 Ed Byrne
 Fiona O'Loughlin
 Greg Fleet with Mick Moriarty
 Jason Byrne
 Jeff Green
 The cast of Keating!
 Mark Watson
 Phil Nichol
 Russell Howard
 Shappi Khorsandi
 Stephen K. Amos
 Puppet Up: The Jim Henson Puppet Company
 Tim Minchin
 Tom Gleeson
 Tripod
 Wil Anderson
Source:

2008
Host: Paul McDermott
 Arj Barker
 Charlie Pickering
 Dave Hughes
 David O'Doherty
 Des Bishop
 Fiona O'Loughlin
 Frank Woodley
 Glenn Wool
 Jason Byrne
 Jeff Green
 Julia Morris
 Kristen Schaal and Kurt Braunohler
 Mark Watson
 Nina Conti
 Phil Nichol
 Reginald D Hunter
 Rove McManus
 Sean Choolburra
 Shane Warne: The Musical (Eddie Perfect)
 Shappi Khorsandi
 Stephen K Amos
 Tom Gleeson
 Tripod
 Umbilical Brothers
 Wil Anderson
Source:

2009
Host: Shaun Micallef
 Adam Hills
 Arj Barker
 Brendon Burns
 Charlie Pickering
 Chooky Dancers
 Dave Hughes
 Denise Scott
 Des Bishop
 Fiona O'Loughlin
 Hannah Gadsby
 James Galea
 Jamie Kilstein
 Jason Byrne
 Jimeoin
 Josh Thomas
 Josie Long
 Judith Lucy
 Mike Wilmot
 Nina Conti
 Otis Lee Crenshaw
 Russell Kane
 Sammy J
 Sarah Millican
 Tim Minchin
 Tim Vine
 Tom Gleeson
Source:

2010
Host: Kitty Flanagan
 Aamer Rahman
 Andrew O'Neill
 Arj Barker
 Bobby Spade
 Damian Callinan
 Felicity Ward
 Frank Woodley
 Hannah Gadsby
 Jamie Kilstein
 Jason Byrne
 Jimeoin
 Jon Richardson
 Josh Thomas
 Nina Conti
 The Pajama Men
 Russell Kane
 Sam Simmons
 Sarah Millican
 Tim Vine
 Tom Gleeson
 Tripod
 Wil Anderson
Source:

2011
Host: Josh Thomas
 Bob Franklin
 Cal Wilson
 Caroline Rhea
 Dave Thornton
 Dead Cat Bounce
 Denise Scott
 Doc Brown
 Eddie Perfect
 Hannibal Buress
 Jason Byrne
 Maria Bamford
 Moshe Kasher
 Paul F. Tompkins
 Reginald D Hunter
 Russell Kane
 Stephen K Amos
 Steve Hughes
 The Bedroom Philosopher
 Tom Gleeson
 Wil Anderson
Source:

2012
Host: Sammy J & Randy
 Cal Wilson
 Celia Pacquola
 Dave Hughes
 Dave Thornton
 David Callan
 David O'Doherty
 DeAnne Smith
 Dixie Longate
 Fiona O'Loughlin
 Frank Woodley
 Glenn Wool
 Greg Fleet and Mick Moriarty
 Hannah Gadsby
 Jason Byrne
 Keith Robinson
 Mike Wilmot
 Paul Foot
 Peter Helliar
 Sarah Kendall
 Stephen K Amos
 Tom Ballard
 Tom Green
Source:

2013
Host: Dave Hughes
 Arj Barker
 Cal Wilson
 Dave Callan
 Dave Hughes
 Dave Thornton
 Hannah Gadsby
 Idiots of Ants
 Jimmy McGhie
 Josh Thomas
 Kitty Flanagan
 Loretta Maine
 Matt Okine
 Paul Foot
 Peter Helliar
 Ronny Chieng
 Sarah Millican
 Sean Choolburra
 Steve Hughes
 Stephen K Amos
 The Kransky Sisters
 Tom Ballard
 Tommy Little
 Urzila Carlson
Source:

2014
Host: Eddie Perfect
 Celia Pacquola
 Denise Scott
 Doc Brown
 Eddie Ifft
 Eddie Perfect, Tripod & The MSO Chorus
 Felicity Ward
 Fiona O'Loughlin
 Frank Woodley
 Jason Byrne
 Jeff Green
 Joel Creasey
 Lawrence Mooney
 Luke McGregor
 Matt Okine
 Max & Ivan
 Milton Jones
 Paul Foot
 Ronny Chieng
 Sammy J & Randy
 The Boy With Tape On His Face
 Tom Ballard
 Tom Gleeson
 Urzila Carlson
Source:

2015
Host: Joel Creasey
 Arj Barker
 Celia Pacquola
 Dave Hughes
 Dave Thornton
 Fiona O'Loughlin
 Hannah Gadsby
 James Acaster
 Jason Byrne
 Jeff Green
 Joel Creasey
 Lawrence Mooney
 Luisa Omielan
 Matt Okine
 Max & Ivan
 Mike Wilmot
 Nazeem Hussain
 ONGALS
 Pajama Men
 Paul Foot
 Puddles
 Ronny Chieng
 Sammy J & Randy
 Tom Ballard
 Tommy Little
 Urzila Carlson
Source:

2016
Host: Celia Pacquola
 Anne Edmonds
 Arj Barker
 Andy Saunders
 Daniel Sloss
 Dave Hughes
 Dave Thornton
 David O'Doherty
 Frank Woodley
 Hal Cruttenden
 Ivan Aristeguieta
 Jake Johannsen
 Jeff Green
 Joel Creasey
 Joel Dommett
 Luisa Omielan
 Matt Okine
 Nazeem Hussain
 Rhys Nicholson
 Rich Hall
 Sammy J & Randy
 Steen Raskopoulos
 Stephen K Amos
 Tommy Little
Source:

2017
Host: Wil Anderson
 Anne Edmonds
 Arj Barker
 Aunty Donna
 Cal Wilson
 Damien Power
 Daniel Connell
 Daniel Sloss
 DeAnne Smith
 Demi Lardner
 Frank Woodley
 Ivan Aristeguieta
 Jason Byrne
 Joel Creasey
 Lawrence Mooney
 Loyiso Gola
 Luke McGregor
 Mae Martin
 Matt Okine
 Nick Cody
 Paul Foot
 Rhys Nicholson
 Sammy J
 Stephen K Amos
 Stuart Goldsmith
 Tommy Little
 Urzila Carlson
Source:

2018
Host: Matt Okine
 Arj Barker
 Becky Lucas
 Briefs
 Cal Wilson
 Carl Donnelly
 Dane Simpson
 Dave Hughes
 Dave Thornton
 DeAnne Smith
 Douglas Lim
 Geraldine Hickey
 James Galea
 Jeff Green
 Joel Creasey
 Lady Rizo
 Loyiso Gola
 Luke Heggie
 Nath Valvo
 Phil Wang
 Rich Hall
 Sam Simmons
 Sammy J & Randy
 Stephen K Amos
 Tom Gleeson
 Tommy Little
 Urzila Carlson
Source:

2019
Host: Tom Gleeson
 Anne Edmonds
 Becky Lucas
 Damien Power
 Daniel Connell
 Dave Thornton
 DeAnne Smith
 Douglas Lim
 Fern Brady
 Geraldine Hickey
 Guy Montgomery
 John Hastings
 Larry Dean
 Mel Buttle
 Nath Valvo
 Nazeem Hussain
 Nikki Britton
 Georgie Carroll
 Paul Foot
 Phil Wang
 Rhys Nicholson
 Sam Campbell & Paul Williams
 Steph Tisdell
 Tommy Little
 You Am I
Source:

2021
Host: Becky Lucas
 Aaron Chen
 Andy Saunders
 Arj Barker
 Blake Freeman
 Carl Donnelly
 Dane Simpson
 Daniel Connell
 Dave Thornton
 David Quirk
 Georgie Carroll
 Geraldine Hickey
 Joel Creasey
 Jude Perl
 Lizzy Hoo
 Lloyd Langford
 Nick Cody
 Nikki Britton
 Randy Feltface
 Reuben Kaye
 Sam Taunton
 Tommy Little
 Tripod
 Zoë Coombs Marr
Source:

References

Melbourne-related lists
Performing arts in Melbourne
Charity events in Australia